Umsobomvu Local Municipality is a local municipality in the Pixley ka Seme District Municipality district of the Northern Cape province of South Africa.

Main places
The 2011 census divided the municipality into the following main places:

Politics 

The municipal council consists of thirteen members elected by mixed-member proportional representation. Seven councillors are elected by first-past-the-post voting in seven wards, while the remaining six are chosen from party lists so that the total number of party representatives is proportional to the number of votes received. In the election of 1 November 2021 the African National Congress (ANC) won a majority of seven seats on the council.
The following table shows the results of the election.

References

External links
 Official website

Local municipalities of the Pixley ka Seme District Municipality